Psychrobacter vallis is a Gram-negative, psychrophilic, halotolerant, nonmotile bacterium of the genus  Psychrobacter, which was isolated from cyanobacterial mat samples from the McMurdo Dry Valley region of Antarctica.

References

External links
Type strain of Psychrobacter vallis at BacDive -  the Bacterial Diversity Metadatabase

Moraxellaceae
Bacteria described in 2005
Psychrophiles